The Republic of Guinea is a multilingual country, with over 40 languages spoken. The official language is French, which was inherited from colonial rule.

Several indigenous languages have been given the status of national languages: Fula (or Pular); Malinké (or Maninka); Susu; Kissi; Kpelle (also known in French as Guerzé) and Loma.

Government and institutions 
French is the language of state and of official institutions. It is used as a second language by 15% to 25% of the population, and as a first language by a negligible portion of the population. At the end of the Ahmed Sékou Touré regime, French was the only language used in business and schools.

By region 
Fula (34.6%) is mostly spoken in Middle Guinea, where the major city is Labé. It dominates in the Labé and Mamou regions where it is spoken by 94.5% and 92.4% of the populations respectively.

Malinké (24.9%) is mostly spoken in Upper Guinea, where Kankan is the major city. It dominates the Kankan Region where it is spoken by 87.1% of the population. The Kankan variety of the language was used by Solomana Kante for the development of N'Ko, a standardized unified written Manding language, which is increasingly used in literacy education and publishing books and newspapers in Guinea and neighboring countries.

Susu (17.7%) is mostly spoken in Guinée maritime, where the capital is Conakry. It dominates the Kindia Region where it is spoken by 54.9% of the population and the plurality (37%) of Conakry also speaks it.

Koniaka (4.5%), Kissi (4.1%) and Kpelle (4%) are spoken in Guinée Forestière. More specifically, Kpelle is spoken in Nzérékoré and Yomou. Kissi is spoken in Guéckédou and Kissidougou. Kono is a language used in the south of Guinea, mostly in Lola.

Conakry 
According to a report by Alpha Mamadou Diallo, the first language of inhabitants of the city of Conakry in decreasing order was: Susu 42%, Pular (Fula) 20%, Maninka (with koniaka) 19%, Kissi 4%, Guerzé 4%, French 2% and Toma 2%.

References